The Arras–Dunkirk railway is a French railway which runs from Arras to Dunkirk.

Services
 the line is used for TGV services from Dunkirk and Saint-Omer to Paris via Hazebrouck and Arras, and for local TER Hauts-de-France services. A TER-GV service between Dunkirk and Lille-Europe uses the northern section of the line before accessing LGV Nord at Cassel.

History
The line was built in two stages. In 1848 the section from a junction with the Lille-Calais railway at Hazebrouck to Dunkirk was opened. The section from Arras to Hazebrouck was opened in 1861, and this became part of the route for trains between Paris and London via Calais until the Boulogne-Calais railway opened in 1867.

References

Railway lines in Hauts-de-France
Standard gauge railways in France
Railway lines opened in 1848
Railway lines opened in 1861
1861 establishments in France